Julie Chase (born 28 February 1956) is a Canadian luger. She competed in the women's singles event at the 1976 Winter Olympics.

References

1956 births
Living people
Canadian female lugers
Olympic lugers of Canada
Lugers at the 1976 Winter Olympics
Lugers from Calgary